{{Infobox mobile phone
| name          = Lenovo K6 Power
| modelnumber   = *K33a42
| logo          = Lenovo logo 2015.svg
| logosize      = 100px
| image         =
| imagesize     = 
| alt           = 
| caption       = Lenovo K6 Power''
| brand         = 
| manufacturer  = Lenovo Group Limited
| slogan = The Kickass Power| series        = K series
| type          = Smartphone
| successor     =
| related       = Lenovo K6 (K33a48) 
| released      =  (In India)
| unitssold     =
| price         = ₹ 9,999
| available     = 
| discontinued  = 
| form          = Touchscreen
| sound         = Stereo speakers and Dolby Atmos
| size          =  141.9 mm (5.59 in) H70.3 mm (2.77 in) W9.3 mm (0.37 in) D
| weight        = 145 g
| os            =Android Marshmallow 6.0 upgradable to Android Nougat 7.0
| soc           = Qualcomm Snapdragon 430 
| cpu           = 1.4 GHz Octa-Core ARM Cortex-A53
| gpu           = Adreno 505
| display       =  5.0" 1080×1920 (441 Pixels per inch), IPS display
| memory        = 3 / 4 GB
| storage       = 32 GB microSD up to 256 GB
| networks      = 2G (GSM/GPRS/EDGE): 850, 900, 1,800 and 1,900 MHz; 3G (HSDPA HSUPA) 850, 900, 1,900 and 2,100 MHz;  4G (LTE): B3(TD1800), B5(FD850), B40(TD2300) 
| carrier       = Various
| battery         = 4000  mAh Li-Po, non-removable
| input         = 
| camera          = Sony IMX258 13 MP PDAF Camera with LED Flash| front_camera  = Sony IMX219 8.0 MP Camera
| GPS             = 
| sar             = 0.600 W/kg (head),0.972 W/kg (body)
| other           = 
| website         = http://Lenovo.com
| connectivity    =
WLAN: Wi-Fi 802.11 b/g/n, Wi-Fi hotspot
Bluetooth®: 4.2 A2DP, LE
Radio: FM Receiver
}}Lenovo K6 Power is a midrange Android smartphone launched by Lenovo Group Limited in September 2016. The device supports TheaterMax technology with a VR headset. It is the successor of Lenovo K5 Plus.

 Specifications 

 Design 
The phone has a unibody metal (aluminium) design. It has a 5.0 inch display. Its physical dimensions are 141.9 x 70.3 x 9.3 mm (Length x Width x Thickness) and it weighs 145 grams.

 Hardware 
The phone features a 5.0 inch FHD display with 441 ppi pixel density. It comes with two storage variants of 16 GB with 2 GB RAM and 32 GB with 3 GB or 4 GB of RAM. It is powered by Qualcomm Snapdragon 430 SoC with an octa core 1.4 GHz Cortex-A53 processor and Adreno 505 GPU. It has a 13 MP rear camera and 8 MP selfie camera. It has a 4000 mAh Li-Po battery.

SoftwareLenovo K6 Power''' runs on Android Marshmallow 6.0 and is upgradable to Android Nougat 7.0.

Latest version K33_S231_171114_ROW

Custom ROM
LineageOS 18.1 for Lenovo K6 Power

LineageOS 18.1 for Lenovo K6 Power (Daily Build)

TWRP Recovery for Lenovo K6 Power

Variant
K33a42 - Lenovo K6 Power - 4GB/32GB - 4000 mAh

K33a42 - Lenovo K6 Power - 3GB/32GB - 4000 mAh

K33a48 - Lenovo K6 - 3GB/32GB - 3000 mAh

K33b36 - Lenovo K6 - 2GB/16GB - 3000 mAh

References

K6 Power
Android (operating system) devices
Mobile phones introduced in 2016
Discontinued smartphones